Andrew Ian MacKinlay (born 21 September 1967) is a former South African cricketer.  MacKinlay was a right-handed batsman who bowled right-arm fast-medium.  He was born at Durban, Natal Province.

MacKinlay made his debut in List A cricket for Natal Country Districts against Transvaal in the Nissan Shield during the 1991/92 season.  His second and final appearance in List A cricket for Natal Country Districts came against Orange Free State in the following season's competition.

MacKinlay later represented the Essex Cricket Board in List A cricket.  His first match for the Board came against Ireland in the 1999 NatWest Trophy.  From 1999 to 2001, he played 4 matches for the Board, the last of which came against Suffolk in the 2001 Cheltenham & Gloucester Trophy.  In his career total of 6 List A matches, he scored 83 runs at a batting average of 27.66, with a high score of 33*.  With the ball he took 4 wickets at a bowling average of 61.25, with best figures of 1/31.

References

External links
Andrew MacKinlay at Cricinfo
Andrew MacKinlay at CricketArchive

1967 births
Living people
Cricketers from Durban
South African cricketers
Natal Country Districts cricketers
Essex Cricket Board cricketers